Marie-Paule Adrienne Joëlle Timsit (née Jaffray; born 1 May 1938) is a French diplomat.

Biography
Timsit is the daughter of Madame Oemoire, professor of physics, and Georges Jaffray. On 8 April 1965, she married the lawyer Gérard Timsit (* 1935). She studied German and political science and graduated from the École nationale d’administration. From 1964 to 1968, she was the second class embassy secretary in Bonn. For several years she headed the Section d’Europe central Central Europe on the Quai d’Orsay. On 12 March 1986, she was appointed French ambassador to East Germany. The embassy was located on Unter den Linden 40 and looked after around 2000 French citizens. She was ambassador to Stockholm from 8 December 1992 to 10 April 1996.

References

1938 births
Living people
20th-century French diplomats
21st-century French diplomats
Ambassadors of France to East Germany
Ambassadors of France to Sweden
École nationale d'administration alumni
People from Rennes